The Blind People’s Association (BPA) is an organisation in  which promotes comprehensive rehabilitation of persons with all categories of disabilities through education, training, employment, community based rehabilitation, integrated education, research, publications, human resource development and other innovative means.

Overview
Other activities of BPA ensure that people with disabilities are mobile on tricycles and three-wheeler scooters.  Artificial limbs provided to amputees are of international quality and yet the consumer gets it  free. BPA is forging new alliances, it is taking over the management of the Jeet Mehta School for Children with Mental Retarded children. It is starting two Primary schools, one each at Bavla and Naaz where non-disabled and disabled children will study together in inclusive settings.

Blind association of india
Official site

References

Blindness organisations in India